Fantasy is the fifth album by American singer-songwriter Carole King, released in 1973. At the time of its release, it only reached number six on the US Billboard 200 album chart, but has remained highly regarded by her fans over the ensuing decades. Presented as a sort of song cycle, the album opens and closes with two versions of the title song and the songs on each side segue directly into one another.

The Spanish language track "Corazón" (the Spanish word for "heart", also used as a term of endearment, as in this song's lyrics) was a moderate hit single from the album, as was "Believe in Humanity". The flip side of the latter single, "You Light Up My Life" (not the Debby Boone hit), charted separately from its A-side.

Track listing

Personnel
Carole King - vocals, piano, backing vocals, string and horn arrangements
David T. Walker - guitar
Charles Larkey - bass guitar, double bass
Susan Ranney - double bass 
Harvey Mason - drums, vibraphone
Ms. Bobbye Hall - congas, bongas
Eddie Kendricks - backing vocals
Tom Scott, Curtis Amy, Ernie Watts, Mike Altschul - saxophone
Chuck Findley, Ollie Mitchell, Al Aarons - trumpet, flugelhorn
George Bohanon - trombone, euphonium, trombone arrangements
Charles Loper, Dick "Slyde" Hyde - trombone
Ken Yerke, Barry Socher, Sheldon Sanov, Haim Shtrum, Kathleen Lenski, Miwako Watanabe, Glenn Dicterow, Polly Sweeney, Robert Lipsett, Gordon Marron - violin
Denyse Buffum, David Campbell, Alan DeVeritch, Paul Polivnick - viola
Jeffrey Solow, Judy Perett, Denis Brott, Dennis Karmazyn - cello
Technical
Hank Cicalo - engineer

Charts

Weekly charts

Year-end charts

Certifications

References

1973 albums
Carole King albums
Albums produced by Lou Adler
Albums with cover art by Drew Struzan
Ode Records albums
Albums recorded at A&M Studios